The Tigwa River is a river in Bukidnon, Philippines. Its drainage area is located in the northern part of the municipality of San Fernando. It is one of the major tributaries of the Pulangi River.

References

Rivers of the Philippines
Landforms of Bukidnon